Orta District is a district of the Çankırı Province of Turkey. Its seat is the town of Orta. Its area is 706 km2, and its population is 13,207 (2021).

Composition
There are three municipalities in Orta District:
 Dodurga
 Orta
 Yaylakent

There are 24 villages in Orta District:

 Buğurören
 Büğdüz 
 Derebayındır 
 Doğanlar 
 Elden 
 Elmalık
 Gökçeören 
 Hasanhacı 
 Hüyükköy 
 İncecik 
 Kalfat
 Karaağaç 
 Kayıören 
 Kırsakal 
 Kısaç 
 Ortabayındır 
 Özlü 
 Sakaeli 
 Sakarcaören 
 Salur
 Sancar 
 Tutmaçbayındır 
 Yenice
 Yuva

References

Districts of Çankırı Province